The 1997 du Maurier Classic was contested from July 31 to August 3 at Glen Abbey Golf Course. It was the 25th edition of the du Maurier Classic, and the 19th edition as a major championship on the LPGA Tour.

This event was won by Colleen Walker.

Final leaderboard

External links
 Golf Observer source

Canadian Women's Open
Sport in Ontario
du Maurier Classic
du Maurier Classic
du Maurier Classic
du Maurier Classic